Long Division is the second studio album by American indie rock band Low. It was released on May 23, 1995 on Vernon Yard Recordings.

Track listing

References 

Low (band) albums
1995 albums
Albums produced by Kramer (musician)